Falkville is a town in Morgan County, Alabama, United States, and is included in the Decatur Metropolitan Area and Huntsville-Decatur Combined Statistical Area. As of the 2020 census, the population of the town was 1,197.

Falkville incorporated three times: first in 1876, again on June 19, 1886, and lastly on December 13, 1898.

History
Falkville was named for Louis M. Falk, a Prussian merchant who emigrated to the area in the late 1850s. Falk opened a general store in what is now Falkville in 1859 and later became the town's first postmaster. The L&N Railroad was constructed through Falkville in the early 1870s, and a rail station opened in 1872.

In 1936, the Works Progress Administration constructed a town hall for Falkville. This building now serves as the town's library.

1950s tornadoes
Two destructive tornadoes hit the town in the 1950s. On April 24, 1955, an F4 tornado tore directly through the town, killing five and injuring 20. Two years later, on April 8, 1957, a long-tracked F3 tornado hit the southern part of town. That storm killed two and injured 90.

Geography
Falkville is located in southern Morgan County at  (34.371919, -86.908381). Interstate 65 forms the eastern edge of the town, with access from Exit 322.

The town is drained by Robinson Creek and Painter Branch, west-flowing tributaries of Flint Creek, a north-flowing tributary of the Tennessee River.

Demographics

2000 census
At the 2000 census there were 1,202 people, 365 households, and 254 families in the town. The racial makeup of the town was 92.26% White, 5.91% Black or African American, 0.67% Native American, 0.08% from other races, and 1.08% from two or more races.  0.42% of the population were Hispanic or Latino of any race.
Of the 365 households 27.9% had children under the age of 18 living with them, 55.6% were married couples living together, 10.4% had a female householder with no husband present, and 30.4% were non-families. 26.8% of households were one person and 12.6% were one person aged 65 or older.  The average household size was 2.42 and the average family size was 2.94.

The age distribution was 16.6% under the age of 18, 8.7% from 18 to 24, 20.7% from 25 to 44, 21.0% from 45 to 64, and 32.9% 65 or older.  The median age was 49 years. For every 100 females, there were 71.5 males.  For every 100 females age 18 and over, there were 71.3 males.

The median household income was $34,583 and the median family income  was $40,759. Males had a median income of $29,231 versus $23,365 for females. The per capita income for the town was $13,510.  About 5.5% of families and 11.6% of the population were below the poverty line, including 7.9% of those under age 18 and 31.7% of those age 65 or over.

2010 census
At the 2010 census there were 1,279 people, 387 households, and 274 families in the town. There were 437 housing units at an average density of 118.1 per square mile (46/km). The racial makeup of the town was 92.1% White, 3.4% Black or African American, 1.1% Native American, 1.3% from other races, and 1.8% from two or more races. 2.2% of the population were Hispanic or Latino of any race.
Of the 387 households 29.2% had children under the age of 18 living with them, 49.4% were married couples living together, 16.5% had a female householder with no husband present, and 29.2% were non-families. 25.6% of households were one person and 10.3% were one person aged 65 or older. The average household size was 2.51 and the average family size was 2.98.

The age distribution was 18.5% under the age of 18, 6.6% from 18 to 24, 21.4% from 25 to 44, 21.0% from 45 to 64, and 32.6% 65 or older. The median age was 48.1 years. For every 100 females, there were 68.7 males. For every 100 females age 18 and over, there were 90.9 males.

The median household income was $36,848 and the median family income  was $44,150. Males had a median income of $35,450 versus $21,635 for females. The per capita income for the town was $16,850. About 7.9% of families and 11.5% of the population were below the poverty line, including 15.1% of those under age 18 and 24.8% of those age 65 or over.

2020 census

As of the 2020 United States census, there were 1,197 people, 392 households, and 260 families residing in the town.

Climate
The climate in this area is characterized by hot, humid summers and generally mild to cool winters.  According to the Köppen Climate Classification system, Falkville has a humid subtropical climate, abbreviated "Cfa" on climate maps.

Notable people
Tom Drake, attorney, former professional wrestler, politician, and former member of the athletic staff of football coach Bear Bryant
Roy Drinkard, businessman
Rodney Jones, poet

References

External links

Towns in Morgan County, Alabama
Towns in Alabama
Decatur metropolitan area, Alabama
Huntsville-Decatur, AL Combined Statistical Area